Bayly Glacier is a glacier flowing into the head of Bancroft Bay, on the west coast of Graham Land. It was mapped by the Falkland Islands Dependencies Survey (FIDS) from photos taken by Hunting Aerosurveys Ltd in 1956–57, and named by the UK Antarctic Place-Names Committee in 1960 for Maurice B. Bayly, FIDS geologist at the Danco Island station in 1956 who, together with L. Harris, pioneered the route from the Portal Point hut (on nearby Reclus Peninsula) to the plateau in February 1957.

See also
 List of glaciers in the Antarctic
 Glaciology

References
 

Glaciers of Danco Coast